Action Painting II is a 1984 painting by Mark Tansey, now in the Jean-Noël Desmarais pavilion, the contemporary art section of the Montreal Museum of Fine Arts, to which it was donated by Nahum Gelber.

It was produced using a canvas prepared with gesso, before being painted in grisaille.

Sources 
 Analyse, voir § b : Mark Tansey : L'association de la technique du gesso et des images d'archive à la photographie

References

1984 paintings
American contemporary art
Paintings in the collection of the Montreal Museum of Fine Arts